New Fathers 4 Justice is a UK-based direct action fathers' rights group campaigning for the rights of fathers to see their children. It is a splinter group of Fathers 4 Justice.

History

New Fathers 4 Justice (NF4J) is a fathers' rights group. It was founded in September 2008 by activists, who were left awaiting trial when Fathers 4 Justice was shut down by Matt O'Connor.

The first protest was held on 19 September 2008 in Bristol, at the constituency office of Labour MP and Health Minister Dawn Primarolo. The protest was motivated by Primarolo's support of the Human Fertilisation and Embryology Act of 2008.

The group still use Superhero costumes and comic characters in their direct action protests.

Activities

In February 2009 New Fathers 4 Justice activist Richard West has climbed on Pylon at Exeter Racecourse where Ben Bradshaw was hosting an equality meeting.
June 2009 Roger Crawford and Paul Smith held a protest at Oxford's Carfax Tower dressed as a superhero and a court jester to campaign for fathers’ rights
April 2010 Denis the Menace, Bananaman and Captain Equality were among the superheroes who travelled through Oxfordshire as part of a New Fathers for Justice demonstration. About 40 fathers – and some mothers – from across the country gathered in the centre of Oxford. Activists travelled the streets in two battle buses before heading to Witney to Conservative Party leader David Cameron’s constituency off-ice, where they met Henry Bellingham, Conservative shadow spokesman for justice, who spoke to them for 30 minutes.
May 2010 Clad in superhero costumes and kept under a close police watch protesters rallied outside David Laws home near Chard asking him to support the campaign to open up the family courts, a move which would save taxpayers millions of pounds.
June 2010 Fathers demonstrated outside Ken Clarke's home in West Bridgford. Fathers dressed as superheroes demanded a more transparent legal system from Justice Secretary and Rushcliffe MP Ken Clarke.
In July 2010 A protest, dubbed ‘Witney’s Glastonbury Festival of Fatherhood’, thirty activists camped on Wood Green, in Woodstock Road, Witney for the weekend.
In August 2010  Roger Crawford, dressed as a court jester, Archi Ssan, as the Incredible Hulk, and Jeremy Pogue as Superman scaled David Cameron's constituency office roof in Witney.
In July 2011 An activist for campaign group dressed as Batman tried to "Dad arrest" Justice Secretary Ken Clarke outside his home in West Bridgford. Garry Roe, dressed as Batman, confronted Mr Clarke at his home in West Bridgford, Nottingham. Mr Roe questioned Mr Clarke about the Family Justice Review – a review of the family justice system – using a megaphone while he and his wife unload shopping from their car.
In July 2011 For the second time three members of the New Fathers 4 Justice dressed as superheroes scaled the Prime Ministers constituency office in Witney. The protesters were Roger Crawford, of Meppershall, Bedfordshire, Jeremy Pogue, of Cefn Hengoed, South Wales, and Archit Ssan of London. The protest marked the start of the group's "CON-DEM(N) CAMERON campaign" to change family law to give fathers equal status to see their children on separation or divorce.
In September 2011 - Commandos4Justice: Marines on a dangerous mission in Afghanistan deep in the heart of Taliban country in Helmand province brandished placards supporting New Fathers 4 Justice. Dressed in superhero costumes, members of the New Fathers 4 Justice
February 2012 Dressed in superhero costumes, members of  New Fathers 4 Justice protested outside the home of Huntingdon MP and Justice Minister Jonathan Djanogly in Alconbury.
On Fathers Day in June 2014, Jolly Stanesby and Archi Ssan climbed up the face of Exeter cathedral onto the balcony where they unfurled a banner which read "Family courts do evil". Later in the day Archi Ssan abseiled down the front of the cathedral.
In August 2014 Bobby Smith camped outside the holiday home of the UK Prime Minister David Cameron in Daymer Bay Cornwall, Smith was briefly arrested for using a megaphone after speaking to Cameron the previous day.
In August 2014 Martin Matthews staged a one-man protest on the roof of Justice Secretary Chris Grayling’s home. He scaled the roof using a ladder before unfurling a banner reading: 'No rights? Go MAD. Mums and Dads United.'
Later that month six demonstrators climbed on the Apsley Gate entrance to Hyde Park, central London's biggest, which is adjacent to Apsley House, once the home of the dukes of Wellington. Humanworth activists Steve Dawe and Archi Ssan spent more than a week on top the arch sleeping inside the monument.
In September 2014 Bobby Smith and fellow activist Carol Wheeler protested outside the home of Broxbourne MP Charles Walker. Smith said "My Children are growing up without a Father, I want a review of my case, or for someone to bring it up for debate – to give fathers equal rights, ending secrecy in Family Courts and judgements on balance of probability."
In October 2014 rugby star Ian Gough wore a customised scrum cap in support of a fathers' rights campaign group during a televised match following claims that he only has limited access to his son. Gough wore a Spider-Man scrum cap, which was printed with his son's initials, and NF4J (New Fathers 4 Justice) - whose supporters have staged protests dressed as superheroes. Ian was given a formal warning for wearing his Spider-Man scrum cap as Chiefs from the Pro12 league gave him a reprimand following the incident during the televised game.

In November 2014 Bobby Smith (activist) accompanied by Carol Wheeler covered the A Real Birmingham Family statue with a white sheet and pictures of his own 2 daughters in protest at no Father being included in the statue. Smith said 'They've depicted the normal family with no fathers, There's nothing wrong with single mothers but this statue is saying one person can do both jobs, and I believe kids are always better off with both parents in their lives. The director of the Ikon Gallery Jonathan Watkins said of Smith’s protest after meeting with him "We had a good exchange of ideas, He has his take on things, and I have my take on things. I think it's great that somebody has the freedom to express themselves. It's all good, it's part of this democratic society that we cherish."

In December 2014 Protesters held a protest outside the Witney constituency home of The Prime Minister David Cameron that resulted in Bobby Smith and the other protesters being issued with an harassment order. In a video taken by the protesters David Cameron told the group "I really think you've made your point and you can go now. You are frightening my children and the neighbours and that's not fair. At the time Smith said 'We have been protesting within the law, we haven’t been using a loud hailer and were within our rights to be there.' And 'I’m not going to give up'"

In January 2015 Protesters seeking extra rights for fathers in family courts set up camp outside a leading MP's home in Ashtead. Headed by longtime campaigner Martin Matthews, the group of four lit fires and asked passing motorists for support as they converged outside the home of MP Chris Grayling, the Secretary of State for Justice and MP for Epsom & Ewell.
In February and March 2015 Bobby Smith carried out a number of protests alone and with others aimed at Harriet Harman and the Labour pink bus campaign. Starting in Stevenage at the launch of the campaign Smith first confronted Harman in Asda and then again later in the day whilst wearing a T-shirt that had “This is what a victim of feminism look’s like” written on it. Smith said “You're dividing up men and women...you're making it them versus us. Are you thinking of getting blue van?”

Bobby Smith and Archi Ssan also confronted Miss Harman in Croydon, Cambridge
In March 2015 after asking Ed Miliband a question at a Q and A session in Rotherhithe Smith along with other protesters were involved in an altercation outside. It was originally alleged that Miliband was "punched and shoved". New Fathers for Justice later released a video showing Miliband getting in the car unimpeded and smiling throughout.
In January 2016, while Bobby Smith was appearing at the magistrates' court in Stevenage, three activists climbed onto the roof of the court building to support him. The three were arrested and charged with aggravated trespass. Smith was found guilty of breaching a restraining order by putting photographs of his daughters on Facebook, and found not guilty of two charges of violating a non-molestation order.
On 5 August 2016, two activists (Bobby Smith, 34, and Martin Mathews, 49) staged a protest on the roof of Labour leader Jeremy Corbyns Islington home.

Further reading

Family Court Hell by Mark Harris
Jolly Stanesby's website
Roger 'The Jester' Crawford website

See also
 Bobby Smith (activist)
 Child custody
 Fathers' rights movement in the UK
 Jolly Stanesby
 Parental alienation
 Parental alienation syndrome
 Pressure groups in the United Kingdom
 Roger Crawford Activist
 Shared parenting

References

Gender equality
Fathers' rights organizations
Political advocacy groups in the United Kingdom
Organizations established in 2008
Family and parenting issues groups in the United Kingdom